The 1991 Women's EuroHockey Nations Championship was the third edition of the women's field hockey championship organised by the European Hockey Federation. It was held in Brussels, Belgium from May 1–10, 1991. England won the final against Germany, winning their first European title with the help of two goals from striker Jane Sixsmith.

Results

Preliminary round

Pool A

Pool B

Ninth to twelfth place classification

Fifth to eighth place classification

First to fourth place classification

See also
 1991 Men's EuroHockey Nations Championship

External links
Eurohockey Nations Championship Women 1991 Brussels from eurohockey.org

Women's EuroHockey Nations Championship
EuroHockey Nations Championship
International women's field hockey competitions hosted by Belgium
Sports competitions in Brussels
1990s in Brussels
EuroHockey Nations Championship
EuroHockey Nations Championship